Great River: The Rio Grande in North American History is a book by Paul Horgan. It won the 1955 Pulitzer Prize for History.

References 

Pulitzer Prize for History-winning works